Lincoln Chase Williams (December 23, 1917 – January 7, 1995) was an American Negro league outfielder in the 1940s.

A native of Jacksonville, Florida, Williams played for the New York Cubans in 1942. In 15 recorded games, he posted eight hits in 57 plate appearances. Williams died in Jacksonville in 1995 at age 77.

References

External links
 and Seamheads

1917 births
1995 deaths
New York Cubans players
Baseball outfielders
Baseball players from Jacksonville, Florida
20th-century African-American sportspeople